was a village located in Yatsuhiro District, Kumamoto Prefecture, Japan.

As of 2003, the village had an estimated population of 5,415 and a population density of 33.26 persons per km². The total area was 162.82 km².

On August 1, 2005, Sakamoto, along with the towns of Kagami and Senchō, and the villages of Izumi and Tōyō (all from Yatsushiro District), was merged into the expanded city of Yatsushiro and no longer exists as an independent municipality.

Dissolved municipalities of Kumamoto Prefecture